Turrilites is a genus of helically coiled ammonoid cephalopods from the lower part of the Upper Cretaceous (Cenomanian and Turonian); generally included in the Ancyloceratina. Previously (Arkell, 1957) it was included in the ammonoid suborder, Lytoceratina.

The shell of Turrilites is tightly wound in a high trochospiral, with an acute angle at the apex. Ribs are weak to strong and may have 3 or 4 rows of equal numbers of tubercles. Thought to be derived from Mariella. Includes three subgenera.

Subgenera and species
Turrilites has three subgenera. 
 Turrilites (Turrilites) Lamarck, 1801
 Turrilites (Turrilites) acutus Passy, 1832
 Turrilites (Turrilites) costatus Lamarck, 1801
 Turrilites (Turrilites) scheuchzerianus  Bosc, 1801
 Turrilites (Euturrilites)  Breistroffer, 1953
 Turrilites (Mesoturrilites)

Subgenus Turrilites has weak ribs and strong tubercles. Subgenus Euturrilites has strong ribs, commonly depressed in middle, especially on early whorls, and no tubercles. Subgenus Mesoturrilites has almost no ribs and clavate tubercles that tend to form spiral ridges.

References 

 Arkell et al., Mesozoic Ammonoidea (L222); Treatise on Invertebrate Paleontology Part L, Ammonoidea. Geological Soc. of America and Univ Kansas Press.
 The Paleobiology Database Turrilites entry

Ammonitida genera
Prehistoric cephalopod genera
Cretaceous ammonites
Cenomanian genus first appearances
Turonian genus extinctions
Ammonites of Africa
Ammonites of Asia
Ammonites of Australia
Cretaceous ammonites of Europe
Cretaceous ammonites of North America
Ammonites of South America
Taxa named by Jean-Baptiste Lamarck
Fossil taxa described in 1801
Turrilitoidea